George Edward Francis Tittleton (8 September 1909 – 12 November 1984) was a New Zealand rugby league player who represented New Zealand. His brother, Wally, also played rugby league for New Zealand.

Playing career
Tittleton played for the Ngaruawahia Panthers and represented South Auckland. In 1935 he played for Auckland Province against the touring Australian side. He played in three test matches for the New Zealand national rugby league team, one in 1935 against Australia and two in 1936 against Great Britain.

In 1937 Tittleton, along with his brother Wally, joined the Richmond club in the Auckland Rugby League.

References

1909 births
1984 deaths
New Zealand rugby league players
New Zealand national rugby league team players
Waikato rugby league team players
Auckland rugby league team players
Ngaruawahia Panthers players
Richmond Bulldogs players
Rugby league centres